Ray Michael McCallum Sr. (born March 6, 1961) is an American college basketball coach who is currently an assistant coach for Tulane. He previously served as the head coach for the men's basketball team at the University of Detroit Mercy. He is also a former player and head coach of Ball State University. From 2016 to 2018 McCallum served as assistant coach at Georgia State. Previously, he also served as an assistant coach at Oklahoma and  Indiana.

McCallum won Indiana High School Athletic Association Championships in both his junior and senior year at Muncie Central High School. At Ball State he scored 2,109 points during his career and was Player of the Year in the Mid-American Conference his senior year. In 1983 he was awarded the Frances Pomeroy Naismith Award, which is an annual college basketball award in the United States intended to honor shorter–than–average players who excel on the court despite their size.  He was drafted by the Indiana Pacers in the 8th round of the 1983 draft with the 164th pick overall. His jersey (10) is one of two numbers retired at Ball State, along with Bonzi Wells's 42.

McCallum's coaching record at Ball State was 126–76.  He guided the Cardinals to two NCAA appearances during his tenure.

McCallum also served as an assistant coach at Wisconsin, Michigan and Oklahoma. From 2000 until 2004, he served as head coach at Houston, where his record was 44–73.

McCallum has a son, Ray McCallum, Jr., who played basketball for the University of Detroit Mercy for three seasons. He was considered a blue chip prospect in high school and had offers to play for more prestigious institutions, but decided to play for his father. McCallum, Jr. was drafted by the Sacramento Kings in the second round of the 2013 NBA draft.

Head coaching record

Source: NCAA Men's Basketball Coaches Career

References

1961 births
Living people
African-American basketball coaches
African-American basketball players
American men's basketball players
Ball State Cardinals men's basketball coaches
Ball State Cardinals men's basketball players
Basketball coaches from Arkansas
Basketball players from Arkansas
College men's basketball head coaches in the United States
Detroit Mercy Titans men's basketball coaches
Georgia State Panthers men's basketball coaches
Houston Cougars men's basketball coaches
Indiana Hoosiers men's basketball coaches
Indiana Pacers draft picks
Michigan Wolverines men's basketball coaches
Oklahoma Sooners men's basketball coaches
People from West Memphis, Arkansas
Tulane Green Wave men's basketball coaches
Wisconsin Badgers men's basketball coaches
21st-century African-American people
20th-century African-American sportspeople
People from Muncie, Indiana